Peter Seidler (born 1960) is an American businessman. He is the chairman for the San Diego Padres of Major League Baseball.

Seidler is the grandson of Walter O'Malley and nephew of Peter O'Malley. He earned a bachelor's degree in finance from the University of Virginia and a Master of Business Administration from the University of California, Los Angeles. Seidler founded a private equity firm, Seidler Equity Partners in Marina del Rey, California, and is the managing partner. The firm has an estimated $3.5 billion in AUM.

In 2012, Seidler, his uncle Peter, and Ron Fowler formed the O'Malley Group, which purchased the Padres from John Moores.
On November 18, 2020, Major League Baseball approved the transfer of the role of chairman from Fowler to Seidler, who purchased part of Fowler's stake in the team to become the largest stakeholder.

References

External links
Bloomberg profile
San Diego Padres bio

1960 births
Living people
O'Malley family
San Diego Padres owners
University of California, Los Angeles alumni
McIntire School of Commerce alumni